HD 189831 is a class K5III (orange giant) star in the constellation Sagittarius. Its apparent magnitude is 4.77 and it is approximately 366 light years away based on parallax.

References

Sagittarius (constellation)
K-type giants
CD-38 13828
098761
7652
189831